Syndetin is a protein that in humans is encoded by the VPS50 gene. It is a component of the EARP complex that is involved in endocytic recycling.

References